Raymond Parlour (born 7 March 1973) is an English former professional footballer and sports radio pundit for BBC Radio 5 Live and Talksport.

He was a midfielder from 1992 to 2007, and spent his career playing for Arsenal, Middlesbrough and Hull City. He totalled 466 games and 32 goals for Arsenal, winning honours including three Premier League titles, four FA Cup and the 1994 UEFA Cup Winners' Cup. He played ten games for England in 1999 and 2000.

While at Arsenal he was nicknamed "The Romford Pelé", an ironic sobriquet reflecting his combination of solid performance with a humorous, self-deprecating, down to earth personality and an image wholly lacking in glamour. He has been described as an "unsung hero" and praised as a "fans' favourite" for his high work rate and commitment. After retiring, Parlour became a pundit on television and radio. In 2012, he briefly came out of retirement to play for Wembley in the club's FA Cup fixtures.

Club career

Arsenal
Parlour is most famous for his time at Arsenal, where he played for fifteen years. He joined the club as a trainee in 1989 and made his debut for the Gunners against Liverpool on 29 January 1992, conceding a penalty in a 2–0 defeat. 

He rose to greater prominence in 1994–95, when he took part in Arsenal's European UEFA Cup Winners' Cup final loss to Real Zaragoza (having been an unused substitute in the Gunners' 1–0 triumph over Parma in 1993–94). After the arrival of Arsène Wenger as Arsenal's manager in 1996, he became a regular fixture on the right wing or in central midfield. In 1997–98 Arsenal won the Double, and Parlour was instrumental in his club's achievement: he was man-of-the-match in the Gunners' FA Cup Final win over Newcastle United, setting up Nicolas Anelka for the second goal in a 2–0 win. His increasing success in his Gunners shirt did not, however, secure him a place in England's 1998 World Cup squad, coach Glenn Hoddle preferring Spurs' Darren Anderton instead.

In March 2000, he hit a hat-trick in a 4–2 away win at Werder Bremen (6–2 aggregate) in the UEFA Cup quarter-finals. He was the only Arsenal player successful from the penalty spot in the team's shoot-out defeat by Galatasaray in the final. Seven months later, he contributed another hat-trick to a 5–0 win over Newcastle United at Highbury. In April 2001, at the same ground, he struck a 30-yard winner as Arsenal beat Valencia 2–1 in the first leg tie of a UEFA Champions League quarter-final. In 2002, another year in which Arsenal won the Double, he opened the scoring in the Gunners' 2–0 FA Cup Final victory over Chelsea, putting his club ahead with a 30-yard strike that Soccer AMs commentator Tim Lovejoy famously failed to anticipate: "Oh, it's all right, it's only Ray Parlour". In November 2003, he was the stand-in captain who led his team to a 5–1 victory over Internazionale at the San Siro.

In total, Parlour played 466 games for the Gunners, scoring 32 goals in all competitions. His curriculum vitae with the club includes three Premier League titles, four FA Cups, one League Cup and one European Cup Winners' Cup. As of April 2020, his record of 333 Premier League appearances for Arsenal has not been surpassed by any other player in the club's history. Even at the peak of his success, though, he was less acclaimed by football journalists than several of his Arsenal contemporaries, spending much of his time at the club in the shadow of Patrick Vieira in particular. Many Arsenal fans believe him to have been one of the most underrated players of his generation.

Middlesbrough
In July 2004, Parlour joined fellow Premier League club Middlesbrough on a free transfer, signing a three-year contract at the Riverside Stadium.  He played 60 games for Boro in two and a half years, and was an unused substitute in their 4–0 defeat by Sevilla in the 2006 UEFA Cup Final. In October 2005, he was ruled out for two months for knee cartilage surgery. He was released from his contract on 25 January 2007, and returned to train at Arsenal.

Hull City
On 9 February 2007, Hull City signed Parlour until the end of the 2006–07 season in the hope that his experience would help them to avoid relegation. With their place in the Championship secured, it was confirmed on 1 June that the club would not be retaining Parlour's services for the following season's campaign.

Wembley
In June 2012, Parlour was one of several retired footballers enlisted by the semi-professional Wembley to assist them in the forthcoming season's FA Cup. His fellow former internationals Claudio Caniggia, Graeme Le Saux, Martin Keown and Brian McBride joined him as players, David Seaman was recruited as a goalkeeping coach and Terry Venables, formerly the manager of England, served as the club's technical advisor. A television documentary recorded the team's improbable quest for Wembley Stadium glory. In the event, although Wembley knocked out Langford, the club proved unable to progress beyond a replay against Uxbridge.

International career
Parlour made his debut for the England under-21 team on 12 May 1992; he played the whole game as England drew 2–2 with Hungary in a friendly. He was a part of the squads that participated in the Toulon Tournament in 1992 and 1994, England would ultimately win the tournament in 1994 with Parlour playing in the final against Portugal. Parlour won the Prix Spécial award for his performances in the tournament.,
Overall, he appeared for the U21s on twelve occasions without scoring any goals. On 10 February 1998, he played for the B-team in a 1–0 loss to Chile at The Hawthorns.

He made his senior team debut as a substitute in a UEFA Euro 2000 qualifier against Poland on 27 March 1999; he won ten caps for England altogether, without ever scoring any goals. The closest he came to one was in a 2002 FIFA World Cup qualifier against Finland on 11 October 2000, when he 'scored' with a 30-yard strike which hit the crossbar and crossed the goal-line but was incorrectly disallowed by a linesman, the match finishing 0–0. He did not feature in any tournament finals, a knee injury forcing him to withdraw from England's squad for Euro 2000. His final cap came in a friendly against Italy on 15 November 2000. He was called up into the squad several times by new manager Sven-Göran Eriksson in 2001, but was never sent onto the pitch.

Media career
Parlour began his career as a pundit with Setanta Sports in 2007. He has since appeared on BBC Radio 5 Live and Talksport.

In 2019 and 2020, Parlour featured in both seasons of ITV show Harry's Heroes, which featured former football manager Harry Redknapp attempting get a squad of former England international footballers back fit and healthy for a game against Germany legends.

Personal life
Parlour and his wife Karen were a couple from their early youth, although they did not get married until 1998. They have three children: Charlotte, Frankie and Georgina. Their separation in 2001 led to a very high-profile divorce. In July 2004, they agreed how to divide their existing wealthParlour giving Karen two mortgage-free houses and £250,000but they were unable to negotiate a mutually satisfactory arrangement over their income. Parlour thought that £120,000 a year would be enough to meet Karen's and their children's needs: Karen wanted more. The ensuing court case concluded in an award that increased Parlour's annual payment to £212,500, but neither party was satisfied with this outcome, and both appealed against the finding. The couple's second round of litigation resulted in Karen's being awarded an income of £440,000 a year to be paid for five years, an amount that the Court of Appeal thought sufficient to allow her to put aside £250,000 a year to add to her capital. The case led media commentators to suggest that the finding heralded a new era in the divorces of wealthy couples, with non-earning spouses being awarded a larger share of their former partner's income than hitherto, and some pundits forecast an increasing use of prenuptial agreements in consequence.

Career statistics

Club
Source:

International
Source:

Honours
Arsenal
Premier League: 1997–98, 2001–02, 2003–04
FA Cup: 1992–93, 1997–98, 2001–02, 2002–03
Football League Cup: 1992–93
FA Community Shield: 1998, 1999, 2002
UEFA Cup Winners' Cup: 1993–94
UEFA Cup runner-up: 1999–2000

Middlesbrough
UEFA Cup runner-up: 2005–06

England U21
Toulon Tournament: 1994

Individual
Premier League Player of the Month: March 1999

References
General
 

Specific

1973 births
Living people
Footballers from Romford
English footballers
Association football midfielders
Arsenal F.C. players
Middlesbrough F.C. players
Hull City A.F.C. players
Wembley F.C. players
English Football League players
Premier League players
England under-21 international footballers
England B international footballers
England international footballers
FA Cup Final players